The 2013 Pac-12 Conference men's soccer season was the 14th season of men's varsity soccer in the conference.

The defending champions are the UCLA Bruins.

Changes from 2012

Season outlook

Teams

Stadia and locations

Standings 

As of October 25, 2013

Results

Statistics

Honors

2013 Pac-12 Men’s Soccer Players of the Week

See also 
 2014 Pac-12 Conference men's soccer season

References 

 
2013 NCAA Division I men's soccer season